Howard Johnstone McMurray (March 3, 1901 – August 14, 1961) was a U.S. Representative from Wisconsin, educator, and businessman.

Born near Mount Hope, Kansas, in Harvey County, Kansas, McMurray attended the public school, Berea Academy at Berea, Kentucky, and high school at Madison, Wisconsin.
He graduated from the University of Wisconsin–Madison in 1936.
He engaged in the life insurance business 1923–1928, and was an executive with air transport companies 1928–1935.
He was a teacher of political science at the University of Wisconsin–Madison 1936–1942.

McMurray was elected as a Democrat to the Seventy-eighth Congress (January 3, 1943 – January 3, 1945) as the representative of Wisconsin's 5th congressional district.

A confidential 1943 analysis of the House Foreign Affairs Committee by Isaiah Berlin for the British Foreign Office described McMurray as

McMurray was not a candidate for renomination in 1944, but was an unsuccessful Democratic candidate for election to the United States Senate in 1944 and again in 1946. He is best known for his 1946 campaign in which he lost in a landslide to the Republican candidate, Joseph McCarthy. He was also a notable academic, serving as lecturer in political science at the University of Wisconsin–Madison in 1945 and 1946, Professor of political science at Occidental College, Los Angeles, California from 1947 to 1949, and as Professor of government, University of New Mexico, from 1949 until his death in Albuquerque, New Mexico, August 14, 1961.
He was interred in Fairview Park Cemetery.

Notes

Sources

1901 births
1961 deaths
People from Harvey County, Kansas
University of Wisconsin–Madison alumni
University of Wisconsin–Madison faculty
Occidental College faculty
University of New Mexico faculty
Democratic Party members of the United States House of Representatives from Wisconsin
20th-century American politicians